is a Japanese storyboard artist and director. He credits the anime Megazone 23 as his inspiration to have a career in animation. In 2013, he created the animation studio Troyca with Toshiyuki Nagano and Tomonobu Kato, which began animation production on its first work in the fall of 2014. Aoki is the director behind Girls Bravo, The Garden of Sinners: Overlooking View, Ga-Rei: Zero, Wandering Son, Fate/Zero, Aldnoah.Zero, Re:Creators and ID: Invaded.

Filmography

TV series

ONAs

Films

References

External links
  

Living people
1973 births
Anime directors